The 107th Pioneers were an infantry regiment of the British Indian Army. Their origin can be traced back to 1788, when they were raised as the 4th Battalion, Bombay Sepoys.

The regiments first action was in the Third Anglo-Mysore War. They also took part in the Fourth Anglo-Mysore War being at the two major battles the Battle of Seedaseer and the Battle of Seringapatam.

Their next action was at Beni Boo Ali against pirates in Eastern Arabia and the Persian Gulf region led the East India Company to carry out a punitive expedition in 1819 to Ras al Khaimah which destroyed the pirate base and removed the threat from the Persian Gulf. They were also part of the forces involved in the annexation of Burma in the Second Burmese War. In 1903 they were part of the British force in the Somaliland campaign.
	
After World War I the Indian government reformed the army moving from single battalion regiments to multi-battalion regiments. In 1922, the 107th Pioneers became the 1st Battalion 2nd Bombay Pioneers, which was disbanded for reasons of economy in 1933.

Genealogy
4th Battalion, Bombay Sepoys - 1788.
1st Battalion, 4th Bombay Native Infantry - 1796.
7th Bombay Native Infantry - 1824.
7th Bombay Infantry - 1885.
7th Bombay Infantry (Pioneers) - 1900.
107th Pioneers - 1903.
1st Battalion, 2nd Bombay Pioneers - 1922 until disbandment (1933).

References

Bibliography

Moberly, F.J. (1923). Official History of the War: Mesopotamia Campaign, Imperial War Museum. 

British Indian Army infantry regiments
Military history of the Madras Presidency
Military units and formations established in 1788
1788 establishments in British India